Mark Anthony Wade (born October 15, 1965) is an American former professional basketball player. A  and  point guard, Wade played college basketball at the University of Nevada, Las Vegas where in 1986–87 he set the NCAA record for assists in a season, with 406 (in 38 games). He spent the 1987–88 NBA season with the Golden State Warriors, and played one game for the Dallas Mavericks in 1989–90.

In 2002, Wade was named assistant coach for the St. Bonaventure Bonnies men's basketball team. Previously, he had served as an assistant coach with Long Island University-Southampton, Florida Atlantic University, and Cheyenne High School, and was a player-assistant coach with the International Basketball League's Las Vegas Silver Bandits.

On July 12, 2007, an arrest warrant was issued by the Riverside County Superior Court, alleging Wade violated California Penal Code section 503, embezzlement over $400.  Wade was hired as an assistant coach at the University of California, Riverside in April 2005. He was fired on January 5, 2007. Wade has been charged with embezzling more than $15,000, some of which he was supposed to use to cover team expenses while the squad was playing road games during the 2006 Christmas break, even though Wade did not accompany the team on that trip.

The embezzled funds include two UCR checks in the amounts of $5,963.00 and $2,430, an electronic funds transfer in the amount of $2,016 and a $1,548 travel cash advance he received in November.

Furthermore, Wade maintained a past due balance of $3,868.40 on his UCR corporate bank card that the university said it ended up writing off as a loss.

In March 2008, Wade pleaded guilty to embezzlement. He was sentenced on May 14, 2008. He was placed on three years' probation and handed a 150-day jail sentence. He started serving the time on a work-release program in August 2008.

See also
 List of NCAA Division I men's basketball players with 20 or more assists in a game

References

External links
NBA stats @ basketballreference.com

1965 births
Living people
21st-century African-American people
African-American basketball coaches
African-American basketball players
American men's basketball players
American people convicted of fraud
Basketball coaches from California
Basketball players from Torrance, California
Birmingham Bandits players
Columbus Horizon players
Dallas Mavericks players
Golden State Warriors players
Hartford Hellcats players
Junior college men's basketball players in the United States
La Crosse Catbirds players
Oklahoma Sooners men's basketball players
Omaha Racers players
Pensacola Tornados (1986–1991) players
Player-coaches
Point guards
Quad City Thunder players
Sioux Falls Skyforce (CBA) players
Undrafted National Basketball Association players
UNLV Runnin' Rebels basketball players
Wichita Falls Texans players
20th-century African-American sportspeople